The Africa Open was a golf tournament on the Sunshine Tour held in Eastern Cape, South Africa. It was first contested in February 2008, over the Gary Player designed championship course at the Fish River Sun Country Club, near Port Alfred.

In order to increase the profile of the tournament, beginning in 2009 it was held in January at the East London Golf Club in East London. In 2009, the Africa Open had a prize fund of R5 million, over four times that of the inaugural event. The Sunshine Tour hoped that it would attract a stronger field as a result, and possibly lead to a co-sanctioning agreement with the European Tour in subsequent years.

In 2009, it was announced that the Africa Open would be included on the 2010 European Tour schedule. It was the third event of the four tournament South African swing of the tour, held after the Alfred Dunhill Championship and the South African Open, and the week before the Joburg Open. The purse for 2014 was €1,000,000.

Winners

Notes

References

External links
Coverage on Sunshine Tour's official site
Coverage on European Tour's official site

Former Sunshine Tour events
Former European Tour events
Golf tournaments in South Africa
Sport in the Eastern Cape
Recurring sporting events established in 2008
Recurring sporting events disestablished in 2015
2008 establishments in South Africa
2015 disestablishments in South Africa